Nuts and Bolts may refer to:

 Nuts and bolts, hardware fasteners
 Nuts and Bolts (TV series), a British television series
 Nuts & Bolts (film), a short film
 Nuts & Bolts (Utility), a Utility Collection of McAfee; no longer available
 Banjo-Kazooie: Nuts & Bolts, a video game
 Nuts and Bolts (general relativity), fixed point sets of the symmetry group in general relativity
 Nuts + Bolts, an American television series on Viceland
 A cereal/nut snack mix similar to Chex Mix, generally made in English Canada